Ray Lannom Watts (born December 18, 1953) is an American physician-researcher in neurology, educator and university administrator. Watts has served as the seventh president of the University of Alabama at Birmingham (UAB) since February 2013.

Education and Early Career, Research and Service 
A Birmingham native and graduate of West End High School, Watts earned a bachelor's degree in biomedical and electrical engineering (with honors) from UAB in 1976. Four years later, he graduated from Washington University School of Medicine in St. Louis as valedictorian of his class.

Watts then completed a neurology residency, medical internship, and clinical fellowships at Harvard Medical School and Massachusetts General Hospital, followed by a two-year medical staff fellowship at the National Institutes of Health (NIH).

In 1986, Watts joined the faculty of Emory University in Atlanta as director of a team that helped create an internationally renowned research and clinical center for Parkinson's disease and other movement disorders.

In 2003, Watts returned to UAB as the John N. Whitaker Professor and Chairman of the Department of Neurology. There he led the development of an interdisciplinary research program aimed at translating scientific breakthroughs into promising new therapies for neurodegenerative diseases and played a key role in the establishment of the UAB Comprehensive Neuroscience Center. He also served as president of the University of Alabama Health Services Foundation from 2005 to 2010. In 2010, Watts became Senior Vice President and Dean of the UAB Heersink School of Medicine, and later was named the James C. Lee Jr. Endowed Chair.

In February 2013, Watts was named UAB's seventh president by unanimous vote of the University of Alabama System Board of Trustees. He has also served as chair of the UAB Health System Board of Directors and chair of Southern Research Board of Directors since 2013.

Watts has co-edited three editions of "Movement Disorders: Neurologic Principles and Practice." He has authored or co-authored more than 130 peer-reviewed research articles published in journals including Annals of Neurology, Cell Transplantation, Experimental Neurology, Human Molecular Genetics, the Journal of the American Medical Association, JAMA Archives of Neurology & Psychiatry, Journal of Genomics, Journal of Medicinal Chemistry, Journal of Neuroscience, Journal of Neurosurgery, Movement Disorders, the New England Journal of Medicine, and Neurology. Watts was the lead author of the paper "Randomized, blind, controlled trial of transdermal rotigotine in early Parkinson disease" published in January 2007 in the journal Neurology, and the second author of the paper "Transdermal Rotigotine
Double-blind, Placebo-Controlled Trial in Parkinson Disease" published in May 2007 in Archives of Neurology (the first author, Jankovic, was the second author of the first published paper). The editor of Archives of Neurology, upon learning of the earlier publication, compared the two writings and deemed them to be "redundant publications...additional information [in the second publication] represents a minor contribution". The second paper cited the first paper in a late draft after questions about the methodology arose, but did not mention the similarity of the data . In response, the authors of the papers stated that they strongly disagreed with the editor's conclusions, and believe the focus of the two papers are different. The authors also say that the primary author was not aware of the acceptance of the earlier paper during submission of the second paper. The authors state that the Neurology paper was accepted October 24, 2006, and the Archives paper was submitted in December 2006. The authors did admit "in retrospect, we should have notified the Archives about the complementary article in Neurology" .

Watts is a member of American Neurological Association; American Academy of Neurology; Society for Neuroscience; Alpha Omega Alpha; Movement Disorders Society; International Brain Research Organization; Medical Association of State of Alabama; and the Alabama Academy of Neurology.

Watts served as chair of the Birmingham Business Alliance (BBA) for an unprecedented two consecutive terms (2016 and 2017) and remains a board member. He has also served and continues to serve on boards of other organizations aimed at improved education, economic development, and promotion of the arts and culture, including Community Foundation of Greater Birmingham, Prosper Birmingham, Innovation Depot, Southern Research, Alys Stephens Center for the Performing Arts (chair, corporate board), Alabama Symphony Orchestra (ASO) (2009-2017), and Doctors for the ASO Giving Society (now Physicians & Faculty for the ASO) (founding chair, 2009–2013).

UAB Presidency (2013 - present)

2013 - 2019 
Upon taking office, Watts initiated the most comprehensive, campus-wide strategic planning process in UAB history. The plan comprised individual strategic plans from all of UAB's schools as well as the UAB Honors College and UAB Athletics, and advanced the UAB Campus Master Plan for facilities. Watts said of the ongoing strategic planning process in May 2014, "Established institutional priorities, as well as those of individual schools, departments and service lines, will allow us to confidently invest most heavily in the programs and people that will best advance our mission — where the most impactful achievements and benefits will be realized for the greater good."

In December 2014 UAB disbanded its football program and, as the rationale for the decision, Watts cited exorbitant operational costs and substantial investments that would be necessary to make UAB football financially sustainable. "While this will be a challenging transition for the UAB family, the financial picture made our decision very clear," Watts said. "We will not cut the current athletic budget, but in order to invest at least another $49 million to keep football over the next five years, we would have to redirect funds away from other critical areas of importance like education, research, patient care or student services." On January 15, 2015, a two-thirds majority of the UAB faculty senate voted no-confidence in the leadership of Ray Watts as president of the university. The resolution stated that "decisions by President Ray Watts were exercised in a manner that demonstrates no respect for, or commitment to, shared governance" and that changes in academic operations, faculty benefits, and the disbanding of the UAB Football, Bowling, and Rifle teams were examples of this. Additionally on March 23, 2015, UAB's National Alumni Society issued a statement of no confidence and demanded Watts' immediate resignation. On June 1, 2015, Watts announced steps would be taken to reinstate UAB football, rifle and bowling after campus and community leaders, the City of Birmingham and private donors pledged significant funds to reestablish and sustain the three programs. "The biggest single difference is we now have tangible commitments for additional support that we have never had before," Watts told reporters. "Without that additional support, we could not have maintained a balanced budget moving forward." An initiative called "Finish the Drive" began on August 18, 2015, to conduct further fundraising for UAB Athletics. UAB Football returned to competition in the fall 2017 season.

As part of the UAB Campus Master Plan, UAB opened two new undergraduate-focused facilities in late 2015 and early 2016: a 714-bed freshman residence hall and the Hill Student Center. In his remarks at the grand opening celebration of the Hill Student Center in January 2016, Watts commented, "The new Hill Center is emblematic of the dramatic evolution of the UAB student experience over decades.... It will be, for years to come, a dynamic hub of educational, social and cultural activity, at the very heart of a student experience that is second to none." In late summer and fall 2017, groundbreaking ceremonies were held for a new Football Operations Complex, new School of Nursing building, and a new home for the Collat School of Business and Harbert Institute for Innovation and Entrepreneurship. At the groundbreaking ceremony for the latter, Watts remarked, "By housing these two entities under the same roof, this facility will be a new home for innovation on our campus, and will play a future role in the growth of UAB and the growth of innovation and technology in Birmingham."

In keeping with the institutional priorities established by the ongoing UAB Strategic Plan that Watts initiated in 2012, the university has made significant gains in education and research. In fall 2016, UAB achieved record overall enrollment of 19,535 students, with enrollment growth in every school and the Honors College. Later that fall, it was announced that UAB ranked 20th among public universities nationally in federal research funding with more than $516 in overall research expenditures, representing a $38 million increase in federally funded research from fiscal year 2013 to 2015. Internationally, UAB jumped 36 places to no. 162 overall in U.S. News & World Report's 2017 "Best Global Universities," ranking no. 68 for "citation impact".

UAB's research capacity and information technology infrastructure were greatly enhanced in fall 2016 by the installation of the most advanced supercomputer in Alabama. Soon after, UAB became the  first university in the state to launch internet speeds of 100 gigabits per second, boosting available bandwidth by 10 times the previous capability and up to 10,000 times many standard home internet speeds. Watts said of these advances, "Our new capabilities will continue to attract and support top faculty, staff and students, make us more competitive to secure research funding, allow us to better care for our patients, and accelerate our world-changing discoveries."

These advanced capabilities along with the new facilities enabled UAB to further develop novel undergraduate academic programs. Watts noted in his 2016 State of the University Address (Oct. 25, 2016), "We have built capacity.... We continue to innovate around majors that we can uniquely provide because we have a world-class comprehensive university." New majors launched in 2016 and 2017 included the state's only B.A. in computer and information sciences, Genetics and Genomic Sciences and Immunology, which is the only program of its kind in the Southeast and one of a handful nationwide.

In March 2017, UAB in partnership with HudsonAlpha Institute for Biotechnology (Huntsville, AL) launched the Alabama Genomic Health Initiative to better meet health needs across the state. The project, funded by a $2 million appropriation from the Alabama legislature to UAB, supports one of the nation's first statewide efforts to harness the power of genomic analysis to help identify those at high risk for a genetic disease, and provide a basis for continuing research into genetic contributors to health and disease. At a press conference announcing the partnership, Watts said, "This new initiative will help us begin to harness genomic capabilities by sequencing the genome of patients from every county in the state....[and it] will be truly transformative for the state of Alabama. It will also position us—UAB and HudsonAlpha—at the very vanguard of genomic science and personalized medicine not only in the United States but around the world."

UAB was ranked the top young university (50 years or younger) in the U.S. in both 2018 and 2019 (and 10th and 12th worldwide for those years respectively) by Times Higher Education. Watts attributed this further global recognition to the "dedication and hard work of our faculty, staff, students, alumni and community supporters" and further noted, "Together, we continue to make tremendous strides in education, research and every pillar of our mission.....I celebrate and share this tremendous honor with our UAB community, and I express our sincere thanks to all of those who came before us and formed the strong foundation we work tirelessly every day to honor and build upon."

The Newcomen Society of Alabama (established 1937), which annually recognizes Alabama "organizations and institutions that demonstrate outstanding growth, service, innovation and achievement", named UAB its 2018 honoree. The Society had previously honored UAB in 1971, when the new university was led by its first president, Dr. Joseph Volker. On Nov. 7, 2018 at the annual Newcomen Banquet, Watts delivered the keynote address, "UAB Past, Present and Future: Fueling Innovation and Pushing Frontiers," saying in closing: UAB and Birmingham have, over five decades, thrived on challenge. Even as resources were limited initially, there was an abundance of talent and will to fuel the tremendous progress that continues to this day. I want to thank and give credit to all of the dedicated people at UAB who carry on our complex mission daily with competence and compassion, including our exceptional leadership team who is leading us to the highest levels of achievement in our history, outpacing most of our peers. In partnership with our community, we have made remarkable strides recognized the world-over because we have made those strides together toward a shared vision.

Dr. Volker concluded his Newcomen Address as follows: 'The destinies of cities and their universities are inseparable. One cannot flourish unless the other prospers. Birmingham and UAB have made an impressive start toward these goals....God willing, we will move forward together to become a great city and a great university.'

Today in this Magic City, once a boomtown born of blast furnaces and steel, we are working another kind of "magic" with resources all the more essential in a knowledge economy: bright minds sparked by the entrepreneurial spirit and an unyielding resolve to succeed and excel.

On behalf of UAB, thank you very much for this honor.The Newcomen event served as a prelude to UAB's 50th Anniversary year in 2019, marking fifty years since establishment as an autonomous campus of the University of Alabama System in 1969. The university hosted numerous celebratory events, activities and service projects on campus and in the community, and published a commemorative coffee table book entitled "Fifty Years of Dreams and Discoveries." Watts authored the book's introduction, "Fifty Years of Forging Ahead," in which he reflected, "I have been privileged to witness and play a role in this university's phenomenal growth from several perspectives—as a Birmingham native, a UAB undergraduate, proud alumnus, faculty member, senior administrator and now president." Alluding to Dr. Volker's oft-quoted line, "We would do Birmingham a great disservice if we dreamed too little dreams," Watts wrote, "The early and bold vision for our university and city has been realized on a scale that even Dr. Volker and his faculty could not have imagined. Today UAB dares to dream even bigger because striving for excellence in all that we do is our duty, and we will not let Birmingham, the state or our nation down."

Also during the 50th Anniversary year, Watts announced a major project that had been selected, through a campuswide competitive process, as UAB's Grand Challenge, a key component of UAB's Forging the Future strategic plan. Watts announced that the goal of the community-based initiative, Live HealthSmart Alabama, was to raise the state of Alabama out of the bottom 10 nationally in key health metrics by the year 2030, and he noted, "There could be no grander or more worthy challenge than this, and we well know we are up to the task. It will require the fullest measure of dedication, innovation and collaboration with our community and state — those very strengths that have defined and propelled UAB from the start and now inspire us to push the frontiers even further in our 50th anniversary year and beyond. With our collective will and energies mobilized behind this monumental effort, we will together have an impact that will be felt for generations to come."

2020 - Present 
On January 9, 2020, Watts joined Birmingham Mayor Randall Woodfin and other city officials at a press conference to announce UAB's partnership in the Birmingham Promise scholarship program. Watts said, "As we begin a new year and a new decade, UAB is pleased to join Mayor Woodfin and his entire team and the City of Birmingham in an initiative that speaks to the very heart of our mission and our longtime partnership with our community and state. UAB is honored to be the first academic partner to support the Birmingham Promise scholarship program by providing Birmingham City Schools graduates with an opportunity to attend our university with a one-to-one, full scholarship tuition match."

In March 2020, as COVID-19 began to impact the U.S., Watts and other senior administrators of UAB and UAB Health System established an Incident Command Committee holding daily virtual meetings to coordinate the institution's leadership role in combating the pandemic, which included immediately partnering with the University of Alabama System as well as local and state agencies to develop and implement a statewide response; transition on campus to a Limited Business Model and online instruction; development of a central website, UAB United, as a resource of COVID-related information for the campus and larger community; research and clinical trials of potential treatments and vaccines; development of an exposure notification app used state-wide; and ultimately the treatment of more than 7,000 COVID-positive patients, delivery of more than 272,000 vaccinations, and numerous interviews with UAB experts in national and international media. Watts commented in May 2020, "We have worked very hard to respond to the pandemic from every aspect of our organization. I'm proud of the people of UAB: frontline health care workers, researchers, support staff, faculty, and students as we adapt to a new reality. We are also hard at work planning for when this is over, so that UAB will be an even stronger and better organization to serve the people of Alabama." UAB and the UA System offered in-person, hybrid and remote classes during academic year 2020–21 with masking, social distancing and other safety measures in place.

Despite the pandemic, UAB achieved in fall 2020 a fifth consecutive year of record overall enrollment (22,563) as well as record retention (86.4%). Watts commended the resiliency and adaptability of UAB students as well as faculty and staff. "Our talented, diverse and deserving students have remained resilient during a time of many unknowns and constant change....Our faculty and staff are effectively mentoring and inspiring our students, united behind collaboration, innovation, diversity and all of our shared values. We will continue to forge ahead in all areas of our mission."

In December 2020, Watts officially signed the Okanagan Charter, making UAB the first internationally recognized Health Promoting University] (HPU) in the U.S.

In May 2021, approximately one year after implementing the Limited Business Model, UAB began a two-phase return of employees to campus, and resumed offering only fully face-to-face or fully online classes in summer 2021. In a message entitled "Vigilance and Victory over COVID" in the spring/summer 2021 issue of UAB Magazine, Watts wrote "Together we have confronted the worst global pandemic of our lifetimes with the very best of our collective will and collaborative spirit. We have persevered through 13 months marked by hope, heartache and heroism, and we remain vigilant as the light at the end of the tunnel grows brighter by the day....When we first developed our strategic plan for 2018 through 2022, we intentionally designed a dynamic plan that would adapt to ever-changing circumstances. We could not have known just how adaptable the plan would have to be in the median year of 2020. Thanks to all of you, our ongoing planning and collaboration is bringing success in all pillars of our mission, as together we finish this fight and continue forging the future."

In his 2021 State of the University Address on October 17, Watts highlighted a number of historic strides UAB had made over the past year despite the pandemic, including the fall 2021 freshman class that was the university's largest (2,415) and most diverse ever at 65 percent female, 45 percent underrepresented, and 28 percent first-generation; rankings by Forbes as the number one Best Large Employer in America (ahead of such organizations as the Mayo Clinic, NASA and Google); Continued development of novel, interdisciplinary academic programs and the Blazer Core Curriculum, and 16 graduate programs among the nation's top 25 in U.S. News & World Report, including the number one Master's in Health Administration; UAB's most successful fundraising year ever, including a transformative $95 million gift from Dr. Marnix and Mary Heersink to name the Heersink School of Medicine, the single largest philanthropic commitment in UAB history; and the opening of Protective Stadium, the new home of Blazer Football and what Watts called a "monumental shared achievement" and "one of the greatest examples of public-private partnership" he had ever seen. Watts concluded, "We will not stop. We are never satisfied. We will continue to strive for excellence in everything that we do, and not even a global pandemic can deter our innovation and our drive to serve—and that's important, to serve—and to succeed. We've emerged all the stronger, one of the strongest universities in America....and it's all thanks to you, and your leadership, your willingness to go above and beyond the call of duty no matter how difficult it was, working seven days a week, 365....But we've come through this pandemic and we hope we're at the tail of this recent [omicron] surge....So I just want to say thank you to all of you and tell you how very proud I am to be in the UAB community alongside you all."

Fiscal year 2021 continued what Watts called "the most successful era of research funding in UAB history," with a record $648 million in research awards (an increase of 46% since FY2016), putting UAB 17th (top 4%) among public universities in federal R&D expenditures and 11th (top 4%) in funding from the National Institutes of Health (NIH). Additionally, UAB Hospital had grown to become the 8th largest hospital in the U.S. (1,207 beds), passing Mount Sinai (1,139 beds) and Johns Hopkins (1,162 beds).

Birmingham Business Journal named Watts 2021 CEO of the Year. Watts said of the award, "I am grateful for the acknowledgment of the work we have done as an institution, and I am privileged to be supported by the outstanding leadership and teamwork that made it possible for me to be considered for this award..... UAB is successful because we have great people — leaders, faculty, staff, students, alumni, fans, donors, and civic and business leaders — who share a commitment to our mission and values." When asked to name to "interesting fact about" himself that "most people don't know," Watts replied, "While people know I am a medical doctor in neurology, many are surprised to hear that I still practice medicine and see patients every week. Helping people, treating and curing them, and improving lives are something that, as a doctor, I have always found very rewarding. It is humbling to have the honor and trust of patients and make their lives better — and to guide them and show compassion in difficult times. When I became president at UAB, I hoped very much that I would be able to fulfill my duties in that role and continue to see patients. It makes me very happy to say that it has worked out well, and I have been able to do both."

A December 17, 2021 column on AL.com read, "Watts delivered the goods this year for UAB athletics [with Protective Stadium], and that's great for people who like sports, but his leadership on the east side of campus has been far more valuable to the city, state, region, country and world."

On January 22, 2022, UAB announced that Heersink School of Medicine researchers and surgeons had successfully tested the world's first human preclinical model for transplanting genetically modified pig kidneys into humans. Watts called this major breakthrough in xenotransplantation "a milestone in medicine...that could provide a robust, sustainable supply of lifesaving organs to patients worldwide."

At the annual UAB Institutional Presentation to the University of Alabama System Board of Trustees (February 4, 2022), Watts discussed among other highlights how UAB, through its Campus Master Plan, "continues building one of the most vibrant, state-of-the-art and sustainable urban campuses in the nation". He detailed how, over the previous five years, UAB had invested with the Board's support more than $375 million in total construction, with 16 major new construction projects adding roughly 600,000 GSF of new space (about 250,000 GSF of that being new residential student space), including most recently opened McMahon Hall (May 26, 2021) and Technology Innovation Center (Sept. 15, 2021). Watts also described strategic planning with partner Southern Research and planning for a "new, world-class facility, the Center for Pandemic Resilience" that would "help Southern Research and UAB emerge as the biotech commercialization leaders in the Southeast." He also showcased the ongoing success of UAB's Harbert Institute for Innovation and Entrepreneurship, which in FY2021 generated more than $5 million in revenue, 19 U.S. patents, and 120 Intellectual Property disclosures (and increase of 50 percent over the previous year).

On April 11, 2022, Watts and other senior UAB leadership joined Alabama Governor Kay Ivey, University of Alabama System Chancellor Finis St. John IV and System trustees, Birmingham Mayor Randall Woodfin and other state and elected officials, and donors Lee Styslinger III and Dr. Marnix Heersink at the groundbreaking ceremony for the Altec/Styslinger Genomic Medicine and Data Sciences Building. In his remarks, Watts noted, "This state-of-the-art facility we break ground for today will be iconic in its architecture and profound in its impact—locally, statewide, and globally—for generations to come. It is monumental in many respects. It represents leadership in the future of patient care and precision medicine—developing the most advanced, personalized care (based on unique genetic make-up) to vastly improve health throughout our state and well beyond....[It] also represents increased national and global competitiveness of both UAB and the state of Alabama—in research, innovation, commercialization, and economic development....And, finally, this facility represents the power of our public/private partnership—among UAB and the UA System, individual and corporate donors, our business community, and our city, county, and state leadership—to drive better health and prosperity for the people of Alabama, whom we proudly serve."

UAB and the city of Birmingham hosted the 2022 World Games from July 7 through July 17. UAB played a central role as a World Games Foundation Partner and official medical provider, and UAB campus was home to the Athlete's Village housing athletes and coaches. On July 6, Watts sent a newsletter to the UAB community thanking them for their support and involvement. "Anticipation builds as we approach tomorrow's opening of the World Games 2022. Our residence halls have transformed into the Athletes' Village....and our Campus Recreation Center, Track & Field facilities, and PNC Field will soon be filled with athletes and fans from across the globe....I want to thank all of you across our academic and clinical enterprises who are playing a role in this historic event. Your dedication, enthusiasm, and commitment to excellence...is contributing to the success of the World Games and helping showcase UAB, Birmingham, and the State of Alabama on a global stage. We can look forward to an exciting ten days of competition and camaraderie with our guests from around the world." The Games attracted a total of 3,459 athletes from 99 nations, 375,000 spectators, and 3,000 volunteers, and a local reporter described how the Games had turned Birmingham into a "melting pot". By July 12, UAB Medicine had treated more than 400 patients, including 89 athletes and 312 spectators and visitors. UAB faculty and students were involved in production of both the opening and closing ceremonies held at Protective Stadium, with UAB University Professor of Music Henry Panion III serving as the World Games artistic director. Following the Games, Watts sent a second newsletter applauding "UAB's Gold Medal Performance". "The World Games was a two-week whirlwind more than two years in the making. As a native of Birmingham and president of UAB, I could not be more proud that visitors and viewers from around the world experienced the strength and beauty of our city and our great institution..... The competition was truly world-class. Equally impressive were the dedication, excellence, teamwork, sacrifice and strong sense of service from you that made it all possible....This was a big moment for our campus, our city and our state, and you delivered. On behalf of a grateful community and world — thank you."

Watts delivered his tenth State of the University Address on Thursday, Nov. 10, 2022 at the Hill Student Center Alumni Theater. “Let me just start by saying how proud I am to be able to serve alongside you at this great institution that is so mission-focused in everything we do. Our 26,000 employees and 22,000 students are committed to making the world a better place each and every day.” He went on to announce that UAB had achieved another consecutive year of record research funding, topping $700 million to reach $715 million, and continuing the most successful era of research funding in UAB’s history, with 50 percent growth over five years. “All of our schools are excelling” in research and scholarship, Watts said, also noting the “global competitiveness in research and innovation,” with the recently published U.S. News & World Report “Best Global Universities” ranking UAB among the top 8 percent globally and top 20 percent nationally, based on “critical criteria such as publications and citations.” Among other accomplishments in what he called “a remarkable year,” Watts highlighted:  

 Fall 2022 total enrollment (21,639) that marked the university’s fifth straight year of surpassing 21,500 students. “You might say, ‘why is that important?’” Watts commented. “Well, if you read any of the headlines, you see that two-year and four-year college enrollments are down across the country. So our team has worked hard to make sure that we’re still providing a great education to our young people, our citizens, so they can be the leaders of tomorrow.”

 A freshman class in fall 2022 that was again UAB’s most diverse ever (66 percent female; 55 percent underrepresented; 35 percent first-generation) and a record number of international students (1,476) representing 84 countries. “And that is intentional,” Watts pointed out. “Because, as you know, diversity is one of our core values and to bring international diversity for our in-state students, many of whom have not left the United States, gives them an opportunity to learn from one another. Learning in the classroom is important but [so is] learning outside the classroom and learning about other people and really learning that, while we might seem different, we’re all much more alike, and learning to understand one another’s culture.”
 After discussing UAB’s new Blazer Core Curriculum (scheduled for rollout in fall 2023) and recognizing UAB’s 16 graduate programs ranked in the top 25 nationally by U.S. News & World Report, Watts noted, “Our people are continuing to earn national and global recognition” as well, including three new members of the National Academy of Medicine, making for seven UAB faculty currently in the Academy and 17 members total in UAB history.
 Partner Southern Research “is retooling through a new strategic plan in concert with UAB to build a new modern campus,” Watts explained. Local and state leaders including Alabama Governor Kay Ivy participated in the May 16 groundbreaking for what Watts described as a “beautiful new building…[that] will be a beacon of hope as it shines at night. It’s going to double their lab space, expand their capacity, grow their talent, and have a doubling of their economic impact….. [W]e’re working with the City, the Housing Authority, Southern Research, and Corporate Realty to put together a master plan to build affordable housing, market rate housing, retail, dining, but also an urban biotech research park that will drive the economy of Birmingham and Alabama.”
 Watts described how UAB’s Grand Challenge, Live HealthSmart Alabama, “continues to expand in its scope and impact….We’re making tremendous progress in striving to improve the health of all our citizens…We have gone in [to our four demonstration neighborhoods] and improved their physical environment, built environment, parks, streets, lighting, recreational activity, community gardens, and we are doing health assessments to determine what diseases they have. And we find them every day as we do these, new patients with unrecognized hypertension, diabetes and many other conditions. And now that we work with the Health System…to help run Copper Green, we bring them access to a primary care doctor. Some of these citizens in some of these neighborhoods—eighty, ninety percent—didn’t have a primary care doctor and it’s hard to take care of these diseases and they show up in our emergency room with a catastrophe. Well, we’re going to change that. This is about providing access to healthcare for all of our citizens….We’re preparing to take HealthSmart to other cities and communities across the state. The next step, we’re going to go down to Montgomery and Selma and Demopolis and take this playbook, this methodology, we’ve developed and bring it to them and challenge their hospitals, universities, city, county, corporate leadership to partner like we have.”
 UAB’s efforts in 2022 were supported by record philanthropic gifts ($111 million) and the university’s endowment surpassed $550 million in book value and $700 million in market value, which Watts deemed “pretty remarkable for a young university that’s about fifty years old.”
 Watts concluded the address by saying, “We’re excited about what we’ve accomplished over the past year and, as you know, we’re going to set the bar even higher in the coming year.”

On November 18, 2022, Watts sent a campuswide email with accompanying video expressing Thanksgiving greetings and gratitude to the UAB community. The message read in part, "In this season of Thanksgiving, I enjoy pausing to reflect on the challenges we have overcome and give thanks for the blessings we enjoy. Across our great university and Health System that together are UAB, 2022 has been a year filled with tremendous accomplishments as we continued to make a positive difference in countless people’s lives in Birmingham, across Alabama and around the world. I am grateful for your hard work and excellence that make it possible to teach and learn, research, care for patients, and meet the varied and complex needs of our campus, as well as our local and global communities."

Personal life 
During his neurology residency at Massachusetts General Hospital, Watts met his wife Nancy Watts (née Angelo), a nurse who had also earned a competitive slot there. The couple worked together as doctor and nurse at Massachusetts General and later at Emory University and UAB, treating patients and educating families and donors about Parkinson's disease.

The Wattses have five grown children and ten grandchildren.

Awards 
 Birmingham Business Journal Power 60 Most Influential Executives, 2022
 Birmingham Business Journal CEO of the Year Award, 2021
 America's Top Doctors, Castle and Connolly, 2000–present
 Best Doctors in America, Woodward and White, 1994–present
 Birmingham's Best Doctors, Birmingham Magazine, 2003–present
 University of Alabama Medical Alumni Association Distinguished Service Award, 2014
 UAB Distinguished Alumni Award 2007
 Who's Who in Health Care, Birmingham Business Journal, 2007
 Raymond D. Adams Lecture, Harvard/Massachusetts General Hospital, March 11, 2004
 Atlanta's Best Doctors, Atlanta Magazine, 2001-2003

References 

1953 births
Living people
Physicians from Birmingham, Alabama
University of Alabama at Birmingham alumni
Washington University School of Medicine alumni
Presidents of the University of Alabama at Birmingham
University of Alabama at Birmingham faculty